The Okhotsk Plate is a minor tectonic plate covering the Kamchatka Peninsula, Magadan Oblast, and Sakhalin Island of Russia; Hokkaido, Kantō and Tōhoku regions of Japan; the Sea of Okhotsk, as well as the disputed Kuril Islands. It was formerly considered a part of the North American Plate, but recent studies indicate that it is an independent plate, bounded on the north by the North American Plate. The boundary is a left-lateral moving transform fault, the Ulakhan Fault originating from a triple junction in the Chersky Range.  On the east, the plate is bounded by the Pacific Plate at the Kuril–Kamchatka Trench and the Japan Trench, on the south by the Philippine Sea Plate at the Nankai Trough, on the west by the Eurasian Plate, and on the southwest by the Amurian Plate.

Geology
The boundary between Okhotsk Plate and Amurian Plate might be responsible for many strong earthquakes that occurred in the Sea of Japan as well as in Sakhalin Island, such as the MW7.1 (MS7.5 according to other sources) earthquake of May 27, 1995 in northern Sakhalin. The earthquake devastated the town of Neftegorsk, which was not rebuilt afterwards.  Other notable intraplate earthquakes, such as the 1983 Sea of Japan earthquake and the 1993 Hokkaidō earthquake, have triggered tsunamis in the Sea of Japan.

The boundary between Okhotsk Plate and Pacific Plate is a subduction zone, where the Pacific Plate subducts beneath the Okhotsk Plate. Many strong megathrust earthquakes occurred here, some of them among the largest on world record, including the Kamchatka earthquakes of 1737 (estimated M9.0~9.3) and 1952 (M9.0). Such strong megathrust earthquakes can also occur near the Kuril Islands, as the M8.3 earthquake of November 15, 2006, Hokkaido, as the M8.3 earthquake of September 26, 2003 and the M9.0 2011 Tōhoku earthquake off the coast of Honshu.

GPS measurements and other studies show that the Okhotsk Plate is slowly rotating in a clockwise direction. Models indicate that it rotates 0.2 deg/Myr about a pole located north of Sakhalin.

References

External links
Okhotsk Plate Modeling
Joint US-Russia Workshop on the Plate Tectonic Evolution of Northeast Russia, Dec. 2004

Tectonic plates
Kamchatka Peninsula
Sea of Okhotsk
Geology of Japan
Geology of Russia
Geology of the Pacific Ocean